The 2007 Regional Municipality of Wood Buffalo municipal election was held Monday, October 15, 2007. Since 1968, provincial legislation has required every municipality to hold triennial elections. The citizens of the Regional Municipality of Wood Buffalo, (this includes the Urban Service Area of Fort McMurray,) Alberta, elected one mayor, nine of their ten councillors, the five Fort McMurray Public School District trustees (in Fort McMurray), and four of the Northland School Division No. 61's 23 school boards (outside Fort McMurray, five trustees each). The incumbent Ward 3 Councillor had no challengers, and the five trustee candidates for the Fort McMurray Roman Catholic Separate School District No. 32 (in Fort McMurray) were unchallenged.

Results
Bold indicates elected, and incumbents are italicized.

Mayor

Councillors

By-Election
On March 11, 2008, Ward 2 Councillor John Chadi resigned from council. A by-election was held on June 9 to fill the empty seat, former Councillor, and 2007 candidate, Sonny Flett was elected. He was official sworn in on June 24, 2008.

Public School Trustees

Separate School Trustees

References

Wood Buffalo
Regional Municipality of Wood Buffalo